Marvin Eugene Rackley (July 25, 1921 – April 24, 2018) was an American baseball player who was an outfielder in Major League Baseball. He played from 1947 to 1950 with the Brooklyn Dodgers, Pittsburgh Pirates, and Cincinnati Reds. He appeared in the 1949 World Series as a member of the Dodgers.

Career
Rackley was born in Seneca, South Carolina. He signed with the Dodgers in 1941, at the age of 19. In his first professional season, he hit .322 in the Georgia–Florida League. After the 1942 season, Rackley enlisted in the Army Air Force. He spent three years in the service and also played some semi-pro baseball.

In 1946, Rackley was discharged and returned to organized baseball. The Dodgers sent him to the Montreal Royals of the International League, where he was teammates with Jackie Robinson in Robinson's first minor league season. While Robinson was the star of the team, Rackley also played well, batting .305 and leading the league in triples (14) and stolen bases (64). Montreal won the pennant and the Junior World Series. After the season, Robinson hired Rackley to play on the Jackie Robinson All-Stars exhibition team.

Rackley joined the Dodgers in 1947. He made his major league debut as a pinch-runner on April 15, in the same game that Jackie Robinson made his debut as the starting first baseman. Rackley would be the last surviving player from either team in that game.

In 18 games in 1947, Rackley batted .222. He finished the season in the American Association. Rackley then rejoined Brooklyn in 1948 and had his best major league campaign, hitting .327 in 88 games. On May 1, 1949, he was traded to Pittsburgh for first baseman Johnny Hopp. But after three weeks with the Pirates (during which Rackley appeared in 11 games played and batted .314), the trade was voided on June 7 and Rackley went back to the Dodgers. He was purchased by Cincinnati in October, for $60,000. He played five games for them in 1950 before going to the Pacific Coast League's Seattle Rainiers. Over the next several years, Rackley also played in the Southern Association and the International League. He retired in 1955 and died in April 2018 at the age of 96.

References

External links

1921 births
2018 deaths
Atlanta Crackers managers
Atlanta Crackers players
Baltimore Orioles (IL) players
Baseball players from South Carolina
Birmingham Barons players
Brooklyn Dodgers players
Cincinnati Reds players
Dayton Ducks players
Durham Bulls players
Major League Baseball center fielders
Minor league baseball managers
Montreal Royals players
People from Seneca, South Carolina
Pittsburgh Pirates players
Richmond Virginians (minor league) players
St. Paul Saints (AA) players
Seattle Rainiers players
United States Army Air Forces personnel of World War II
Valdosta Trojans players